KNAB (1140 AM, The Peoples Choice) is a radio station broadcasting an adult standards music format. Licensed to Burlington, Colorado, United States.  The station is currently owned by Knab and features programming from Citadel Broadcasting and Westwood One.

References

External links

NAB
NAB